Jakub Kacper Sławek (born 1976) is a Polish diplomat, since 2020 chargé d'affaires and since 2022 ambassador of the Republic of Poland to the United Arab Emirates.

Life 
Jakub Sławek graduated from Arabic studies at the Institute of Oriental Philology of the Jagiellonian University (2002). He also studied at Collegium Civitas in Warsaw, Paris and Damascus. In 2004 he became a sworn translator of the Arabic language. In 2008, at the Faculty of Oriental Studies at the University of Warsaw, he obtained a PhD in literary studies on the basis of the dissertation Tribalism and Text in the Culture of Yemen (doctoral advisor – Marek Dziekan).

In 2002 he started working at the Ministry of Foreign Affairs. He stayed at posts in Sanaa, Yemen (until 2006), Algiers, Algeria (from September 2007), and Riyadh, Saudi Arabia as the deputy head of the mission and the Consul of the Republic of Poland (from June 2012). In December 2017, he became deputy ambassador to Abu Dhabi, United Arab Emirates. On 1 October 2020, he took the position of chargé d'affaires ad interim there. He took the post on 11 March 2022.

Personal life 
Son of Ewa and Tadeusz Sławek. Married to Beata Sławek, father of three children.

Apart from Polish and Arabic, he speaks English, French, Italian and Russian.

Works 

 Jakub Sławek: Jemen – świat wartości plemiennych. Kurowice: Wydawnictwo Ibidem, 2011. ISBN 978-83-62331-03-1.
 Jakub Sławek: Arabskie i polskie słownictwo dyplomatyczne i polityczne = Muʿǧam būlandī-ʿarabī li ǎl-muṣṭalaḥāt ad-diblūmāsiyya wa as-siyāsiyya. Katowice: Wydawnictwo Uniwersytetu Śląskiego, 2016. .

Translations

 Janusz Spyra: In the shadow of the Skoczów synagogue. Bielsko-Biała: Jewish Religious Community, 1998, .

References 

 

1976 births
Ambassadors of Poland to the United Arab Emirates
Jagiellonian University alumni
Polish Arabists
Living people